Edith Alma Eileen Savell (1883–1970) was a New Zealand farmer and volunteer nurse. She was born in Lyttelton, Canterbury, New Zealand in 1883.

References

1883 births
1970 deaths
New Zealand farmers
New Zealand nurses
People from Lyttelton, New Zealand
New Zealand women nurses